Lucas Pimenta Peres Lopes (born 17 July 2000), commonly known as Lucas Pimenta or simply Pimenta, is a Brazilian professional footballer who plays as a defender for Al Wahda in the UAE Pro League.

Career statistics

Club

Notes

References

External links

2000 births
Living people
Brazilian footballers
Brazilian expatriate footballers
Association football defenders
UAE Pro League players
Botafogo de Futebol e Regatas players
Al Wahda FC players
Expatriate footballers in the United Arab Emirates
Brazilian expatriate sportspeople in the United Arab Emirates
Sportspeople from Niterói